Amanda Louise Holden (born 16 February 1971) is an English media personality, actress, and singer. Since 2007, she has been a judge on the television talent show competition Britain's Got Talent on ITV. She also co-hosts the Heart Breakfast radio show with Jamie Theakston on weekday mornings.

Holden played the title role in the musical stage show Thoroughly Modern Millie in 2004, for which she was nominated for a Laurence Olivier Award. Her acting credits on television include The Grimleys (1998–2001), Kiss Me Kate (1999–2001), Cutting It (2002–2004), Wild at Heart (2006–2008), and Big Top (2009). Holden has also presented various television shows for ITV, including The Sun Military Awards (2009–2014), Superstar (2012), This Morning (2014–2015, 2017), Text Santa (2015), and Give a Pet a Home (2015).

In 2013, Holden released her autobiography book, No Holding Back, which became a Sunday Times bestseller. In 2020, she released her debut studio album, Songs from My Heart, which reached the top 5 on the UK Albums Chart.

Early life
Holden was born in Portsmouth, Hampshire and spent much of her childhood in Bishop's Waltham, and aged nine she joined Bishop's Waltham Little Theatre Company. 

She attended the secondary community school Swanmore College. At age 16, she relocated to Bournemouth, before moving to South London to attend Mountview Academy of Theatre Arts.

Career

Television
Holden's first television appearance was as a contestant on the game show Blind Date in 1991. From 2006 to 2008, Holden appeared as Sarah Trevanian in three series of ITV's Wild at Heart co-starring Stephen Tompkinson.

In 1997 she was a cast member of pioneering Channel 5 sketch show, "We Know Where You Live" alongside Simon Pegg, Sanjeev Baskar, Ella Kenion, Fiona Allen and Jeremy Fowlds. 

Holden's other TV credits include three series of the comedy Kiss Me Kate with Caroline Quentin and Chris Langham, three series of ITV's The Grimleys, Celeb with Harry Enfield, BBC series Hearts and Bones with Damian Lewis, the Jonathan Creek episode "The Problem at Gallowes Gate", and a Boxing Day special Agatha Christie's Marple episode "4.50 From Paddington" opposite Geraldine McEwan and John Hannah. She co-starred with Bill Nighy and Tom Courtenay in Ready When You Are, Mr. McGill, a comedy drama by Jack Rosenthal. Holden is a judge on Britain's Got Talent along with Simon Cowell, David Walliams, and Alesha Dixon. She joined the show in 2006.

She has appeared on British series such as Smack the Pony, EastEnders, Hearts and Bones, and Cutting It.

In 2009, Holden appeared as Lizzie, the Ring Mistress, in the BBC circus sitcom Big Top. In April 2009 it was reported the US network CBS had offered Holden a job as one-time guest presenter on The Early Show, a daytime talk show. On 1 June 2009 she appeared with regular presenters Harry Smith and Maggie Rodriguez. Holden has since signed with CBS as a British correspondent for The Early Show.

From 2009 until 2014 Holden co-presented A Night of Heroes: The Sun Military Awards annually on ITV with Phillip Schofield. In January 2010 she presented her own three-part series, Amanda Holden's Fantasy Lives, in which she tried out three of her dream jobs.

In 2010, Holden co-presented The Door with Chris Tarrant. In 2011, Holden narrated the documentary The Nation's Favourite Bee Gees Song on ITV. On 6 July 2012 Holden guest presented an episode of Lorraine, standing in for Lorraine Kelly. She returned to guest present six further episodes of the show from 4 to 8 April and on 4 July 2016.

In 2012, Holden presented talent show Superstar on ITV. On 24 March 2014 she hosted an episode of the Channel 4 show Dispatches about the treatment for stillbirths and miscarriages.

From 22 September to 18 December 2014, Holden filled in as a co-host on This Morning with Phillip Schofield during Holly Willoughby's maternity leave. She took a short break in January and February 2015 to record the Britain's Got Talent auditions. Christine Lampard stood in for Holden during this time, before the latter returned to the show from 2 March until 17 July 2015. She returned to This Morning in 2017, to co-present numerous episodes with Ben Shephard.

Holden presented a six-part factual series for ITV called Give a Pet a Home, which worked alongside the RSPCA finding homes for animals. The series aired in April and May 2015.

On 18 December 2015 Holden was part of the presenting team for ITV's Christmas telethon Text Santa. In 2016 she presented I've Got Something To Tell You, a factual series for the W television channel. She appeared as Miss Pentangle in CBBC's The Worst Witch in 2017. Holden made a guest appearance in the Australian soap opera Neighbours as Harriet Wallace in 2022. She began filming for the show in London during October 2021.

In 2021, she started appearing in a new comedy mockumentary series from Bo' Selecta! creator Leigh Francis. The programme was called The Holden Girls: Mandy & Myrtle and featured Francis in drag with heavy make-up as Amanda's nan Myrtle. The show launched on the E4 channel with 601,938 viewers and was repeated on Channel 4, gaining enough viewers to be recommissioned for a second series for 2022.

Theatre
Holden has appeared in several stage musicals, and in 2004 was nominated for the Laurence Olivier Award for Best Actress in a Musical for her performance in the West End production of Thoroughly Modern Millie, which closed earlier than expected in June 2004.

Holden finished playing the role Princess Fiona in the original West End production of Shrek The Musical, which began on 6 May 2011. The show opened at the Theatre Royal, Drury Lane on 14 June 2011. She starred with Nigel Lindsay, Richard Blackwood, and Nigel Harman. Holden departed the show on 3 October 2011, ten weeks earlier than planned, to focus on her unborn child and was replaced by Girls Aloud singer Kimberley Walsh. For this role, Holden won the WhatsOnStage.com Theatregoers' Choice Award for Best Actress in a Musical. In 2016 Holden starred in a West End revival of Stepping Out and reprised her role when it opened at the Vaudeville Theatre in March 2017.

Film
In 1996, Holden played Pamela in Intimate Relations. In 1999 she appeared as a shoe-shop assistant in Virtual Sexuality. She was uncredited in the 2013 film One Chance.

Radio
In April 2019, it was announced Holden would replace Emma Bunton as co-host of Heart Breakfast with Jamie Theakston, at the same time as it went national on 3 June.

Music 
In 2019, Holden signed a recording contract with Virgin EMI Records. In 2020 she released her debut studio album, Songs from My Heart, through Universal Music. It reached number four on the UK Albums Chart.

Other work 
In July 2009, Holden became a gossip columnist for the News of the World.

From 2010 until 2012 Holden appeared in television commercial adverts for supermarket chain Tesco. Since 2012 she has appeared in television commercials for Danone Oykos low-fat yoghurt.

In October 2013, Amanda released her autobiography, No Holding Back, which became a Sunday Times best-seller.

In 2015, she was the new face of the Alpen Brighter Morning Challenge.

Charity work 
Holden fronted Everton's breast-cancer-awareness campaign. She is a patron of the football club's charity, Everton In the Community. In September 2011, Holden was sponsored to bake a cake for every child in the Great Ormond Street Hospital.

On 13 April 2008 Holden ran the London Marathon in 4 hours and 13 minutes, in the name of the Born Free Foundation, having collected public and celebrity sponsors online. Since 2013, she has presented the RSPCA's Animal Hero Awards. Holden has raised money for Jeans for Genes and SSAFA via The Big Brew Up.

In 2013, she became a celebrity ambassador for Battersea Dogs & Cats Home, following her work with Pedigree's 'Buy One, Feed One' campaign that she and fellow ambassador Paul O'Grady have been supporting together.

In June 2018, Holden was photographed underwater by Zena Holloway. She posed as a mermaid in an awareness campaign for People for the Ethical Treatment of Animals (PETA) to highlight the "disgusting treatment" of orcas at SeaWorld. Holden has also posed nude for PETA in a campaign to promote vegetarianism.

In 2020, Holden raised money for the National Health Service (NHS) during the COVID-19 pandemic.

Personal life
In 1992, while they were both appearing in The Sound of Music, Holden dated George Asprey. She married the comedian Les Dennis in June 1995. The couple separated temporarily in 2000 after Holden's affair with actor Neil Morrissey, the subject of press interest, before separating permanently in December 2002 and divorcing in 2003. Around this time, she alleged she was sexually assaulted by an "unnamed famous comedian" at a public event.

In 2006, Holden gave birth to her first child, conceived with her fiancé, record producer Chris Hughes. She married Hughes at Babington House, Somerset, on 10 December 2008 with former Formula One racing driver David Coulthard acting as best man. After a miscarriage in 2010, she suffered their son being stillborn at seven months in 2011. In 2012, despite medical complications, she gave birth to their second daughter. As of 2018, Holden and Hughes resided in Surrey. Holden also owns a cottage in the Cotswolds which she has been renovating since 2017.

In December 2016, Holden's ancestry was the subject of a BBC programme in the Who Do You Think You Are? series. The investigation discovered that her Cornish 5x great-grandfather, Collin Thomas, served a year's imprisonment after breaking his apprenticeship as a cordwainer by enlisting in the Royal Navy and leaving the United Kingdom aged 15. Ten years later, while serving in the British Army after the Peninsular War, he met and married a French woman and began a family near Bordeaux, France, then moved his wife and eldest children back to Great Britain. Holden also learned that her grandfather, Frank Holden, a psychiatric nurse, was aboard the RMS Lancastria when it was bombed by the German Luftwaffe in June 1940 outside the port of Saint-Nazaire and sank with the loss of thousands of lives. Frank Holden died by suicide in his 70s.

Holden is a fan of English Premier League football club Everton, attending home and away games when her schedule allows. She has been vegetarian since she was thirteen.

In 2010, Holden campaigned to keep a Sainsbury's supermarket out of Bishop's Waltham. Residents of her hometown accused her of a double standard in November 2010 when she signed a deal to appear in advertisements for Tesco, a UK supermarket chain.

Filmography

As an actress

As herself

Television advertisements

Theatre

Radio

Discography

Albums 
Songs from My Heart (2020)

Singles 
 "Over the Rainbow" (single in aid of NHS Charities Together) (2020), Virgin EMI
 "With You" (2020), Virgin EMI
 "Home For Christmas" (2020) Universal Music Group

Bibliography 
No Holding Back (autobiography)
The Curious Tale of Fi-Rex (novel) (co-writer)

References

External links
 
 

1971 births
Living people
20th-century British actresses
21st-century British actresses
Actresses from Hampshire
Alumni of the Mountview Academy of Theatre Arts
British film actresses
British musical theatre actresses
British people of French descent
British soap opera actresses
British television actresses
British television personalities
English people of Cornish descent
People from Bishop's Waltham
Television personalities from Hampshire
Mass media people from Bournemouth